Singatrichona is a monotypic genus of southeast Asian sheet weavers containing the single species, Singatrichona longipes. It was first described by A. V. Tanasevitch in 2019, and it has only been found in Singapore.

See also
 List of Linyphiidae species (Q–Z)

References

Monotypic Linyphiidae genera
Arthropods of Singapore